The following is a (currently) incomplete list of ambassadors of France to Greece.

For ambassadors and high-ranking diplomats of France in Greece who were active between 1815 and 1905, the data below is taken from a list of diplomats published in 1906 by the French Ministry of Foreign Affairs. For ambassadors and diplomats who were active after 1944, the data comes from two more recent lists also compiled by the ministry. Additional individual references are given in the table.

See also
 France–Greece relations

References

 
France
Greece